Krista Anri Susanna Huovinen (born 10 June 1972) is a Finnish politician of the Social Democratic Party and the Minister of Social Services between 2013 and 2015.

Huovinen was born in Liminka, and was elected to the Finnish Parliament in 1999 from Central Finland. She was deputy chairman of the Social Democratic parliamentary group from 2003 to 2005, when she was elected to the cabinet. She held the post of Minister of Transport and Communications from 24 September 2005 to 18 April 2007.

In addition to her role in parliament, Huovinen has been serving as member of the Finnish delegation to the Parliamentary Assembly of the Council of Europe since 2011. As member of the Socialist Group, she is currently a member of the Committee on Rules of Procedure, Immunities and Institutional Affairs; the Sub-Committee on Integration; and the Sub-Committee on Refugee and Migrant Children and Young People.

References 

1972 births
Living people
People from Liminka
Social Democratic Party of Finland politicians
Ministers of Social Affairs of Finland
Ministers of Transport and Public Works of Finland
Members of the Parliament of Finland (1999–2003)
Members of the Parliament of Finland (2003–07)
Members of the Parliament of Finland (2007–11)
Members of the Parliament of Finland (2011–15)
Members of the Parliament of Finland (2015–19)
Women government ministers of Finland
21st-century Finnish women politicians
Women members of the Parliament of Finland
University of Jyväskylä alumni